The All-Russian Union of Cities  was a political organisation set up in Imperial Russia in August 1914 to help achieve Russian war aims. It was a liberal organisation which after 1915 operated in conjunction with the All-Russian Zemstvo Union. The Kadet politician, Nikolai Kishkin, was the deputy chief representative.

Ukraine
The Union of Cities of the Southwestern Front was based in the Ukraine and was led by Teodor Shteingel. It employed Mykola Biliashivsky, Dmytro Doroshenko, Ivan Kraskovsky, Volodymyr M. Leontovych, Fedir Matushevsky, Andrii Nikovsky, V. Ulianytsky and Andrii Viazlov.

References

Political organizations based in the Russian Empire
Organizations established in 1914
1914 establishments in the Russian Empire